"Luna" is the first single released from the debut album of Panamanian singer-songwriter Eddy Lover, Perdóname (2008).

Charts

Accolades

American Society of Composers, Authors, and Publishers Awards

|-
|rowspan="1" scope="row"|2009
|Luna
|Urban Song of the Year
|
|-

References

2008 singles
Spanish-language songs
2008 songs
Song articles with missing songwriters